Arif Khan or Mohammad Arif Khan was a Mujahideen warlord in Afghanistan and Pashtun leader from the village of Zakhel. He was a military commander and the Taliban governor of Kunduz province. An account indicated that he might have served under or was associated with the militant commander Eshan-Sayad Mirza.

Khan was reportedly killed on April 4, 2000. His death came with the killing of top Hizb-ul-Mujahideen commanders Ghulam Rasool Khan, Ghulam Rasool Dar, and Saif-ur-Rehman Bajwa.

See also
List of Taliban leaders

External links
Afgha.com
World Press Review
Institute for Afghan Studies

References

2000 deaths